Bainbridge is a city in Decatur County, Georgia, United States. The city is the county seat of Decatur County. As of the 2020 census, the city had a population of 14,468.

History
The first European settlement in what is today Bainbridge was a trading post set up by James Burges in the late 18th century. From him comes the name Burges's Bluff. The town was named after U.S. Navy Commodore William Bainbridge, commander of the USS Constitution ("Old Ironsides"), and was incorporated on December 22, 1829.

In 1824, Bainbridge was designated seat of the newly formed Decatur County.

On October 10, 2018, Bainbridge fell victim to Hurricane Michael. The storm left widespread damage through the city limits, including downed trees, power lines, and structural damage. Many residents affected suffered severe damage to their homes.

Geography
Bainbridge is located in the center of Decatur County. The city is in southwestern Georgia along U.S. Routes 27 and 84, which form a bypass around the southern part of the city. U.S. Route 27 leads southeast  to Tallahassee, Florida, and north  to Columbus. U.S. Route 84 leads east  to Thomasville and northwest  to Dothan, Alabama. Other highways which run through the city include Georgia State Routes 97, 253, 309, and 311.

Bainbridge is located on the Flint River, which flows southwest to meet the Chattahoochee. Together they form the Apalachicola River which flows to the Gulf of Mexico. At the junction of the two rivers, the Jim Woodruff Dam forms Lake Seminole. A system of locks at the dam allows barge traffic to travel between the inland port at Bainbridge and the Gulf of Mexico.

Demographics

2020 census

As of the 2020 United States Census, there were 14,468 people, 4,471 households, and 3,111 families residing in the city.

2010 census
As of the 2010 United States Census, there were 12,697 people living in the city. The racial makeup of the city was 54.4% Black, 39.6% White, 0.1% Native American, 0.7% Asian, 0.1% from some other race and 1.0% from two or more races. 4.1% were Hispanic or Latino of any race.

2000 census
As of the census of 2000, there were 11,722 people, 4,444 households, and 3,013 families living in the city. The population density was 255.6/km (661.8/sq mi, Georgia average is 141.4/sq mi, U.S. average is 79.6/sq mi). The racial makeup of the city was 50.34% African American (Georgia 28.7%, U.S. 12.3%), 47.48% White (Georgia 65.1%, U.S. 75.1%), 0.12% Native American (Georgia 0.3%, U.S. 0.9%), 0.64% Asian (Georgia 2.1%, U.S. 3.6%), 0.02% Pacific Islander (Georgia 0.1%, U.S. 0.1%), 0.78% from other races (Georgia 2.4%, U.S. 5.5%), and 0.61% from two or more races (Georgia 1.4%, U.S. 2.4%). 2.00% of the population were Hispanic or Latino of any race (Georgia 5.3%, U.S. 12.5%).

There were 4,444 households, out of which 33.7% had children under the age of 18 living with them, 39.7% were married couples living together, 24.2% had a female householder with no husband present, and 32.2% were non-families. 28.5% of all households were made up of individuals, and 12.9% had someone living alone who was 65 years of age or older. The average household size was 2.52 and the average family size was 3.09.

In the city, the population was spread out, with 28.0% under the age of 18, 9.9% from 18 to 24, 26.9% from 25 to 44, 19.2% from 45 to 64, and 16.0% who were 65 years of age or older. The median age was 34 years. For every 100 females, there were 84.3 males. For every 100 females age 18 and over, there were 78.4 males.

The median income for a household in the city was $24,869, and the median income for a family was $30,557. Males had a median income of $28,918 versus $21,518 for females. The per capita income for the city was $15,589. About 24.0% of families and 26.9% of the population were below the poverty line, including 41.1% of those under age 18 and 18.9% of those age 65 or over.

Economy
It was announced in December 2019 that Brazil-based gun manufacturer Taurus had been granted a $39 million tax-incentive package to move from the Miami, Florida area to Bainbridge in return for creating 300 jobs. The package includes $20 million for construction, $7.9 million in tax credits, $4.5 million for infrastructure, $4.3 million in property-tax abatements, and $3 million for equipment, in addition to a land lease arrangement of $1/year for 73 acres (20 hectares) of land. The subsidy totals $130,000 per job.

Arts and culture

Arts 
 The Firehouse Gallery Art Gallery
 Bainbridge Little Theatre

Annual cultural events
River Town Days is held each year the second weekend of March.

The Swine Time Festival and Decatur County Fall Festival and Fair are annual events.

National Register of Historic Places
The Decatur County Courthouse was constructed in 1902, and is listed on the National Register of Historic Places. Also listed on the Register is the First African Missionary Baptist Church.

Public library 
The Decatur County Gilbert H. Gragg Library is located in Bainbridge. The library serves the population of Decatur County and acts as the headquarters for the Southwest Georgia Regional Library.

Education

Decatur County School District 
The Decatur County School District holds pre-school to grade 12, and consists of two primary schools, one elementary school, one middle school, and a high school. The district has 384 full-time teachers and over 5,782 students.

Schools include:
Jones-Wheat Primary School (grades PreK-2)
West Bainbridge Primary School (grades PreK-2)
Hutto Elementary School (grades 3-5)
Bainbridge Middle School (grades 6-8)
Bainbridge High School (grades 9-12)

Other schools
Grace Christian Academy (PreK-12)
Spring Creek Charter Academy (PreK-9)

Infrastructure

Transportation
The city is a seaport linked to the Gulf of Mexico via Florida's Apalachicola River. Officially known as Port Bainbridge, these facilities are managed entirely by the Georgia Ports Authority.

Parks and recreation
The Bainbridge-Decatur County YMCA opened on September 15, 1986. Its building had a cost of $1,000,000.

Notable people

 James Butler, NFL player
 Alfred Corn, poet and essayist; born Bainbridge, raised in Valdosta
 Marvin Griffin, former Georgia governor
 Miriam Hopkins, Academy Award-nominated film actress
 Paul Kwilecki, documentary photographer
 Jason Lancaster, Singer and guitarist of Mayday Parade, singer of Go Radio, and solo career
 Dameon Pierce, NFL player - Houston Texans 
 David Ross, MLB catcher, two-time World Series champion, Dancing with the Stars contestant
 Kirby Smart, head football coach for the University of Georgia
 Travis Smith, former drummer of Trivium
 Young Stribling, professional heavyweight boxer

References

External links

City of Bainbridge official website
"Bainbridge" entry in New Georgia Encyclopedia
South Georgia Historic Newspapers Archive - Digital Library of Georgia

Cities in Georgia (U.S. state)
Cities in Decatur County, Georgia
County seats in Georgia (U.S. state)